Sean Ronald Hill (born February 14, 1970) is an American former professional ice hockey defenseman who played 17 seasons in the National Hockey League (NHL) for eight different teams. He won the Stanley Cup in 1993 with the Montreal Canadiens.

Playing career
Hill was drafted in the 8th round, 167th overall by the Montreal Canadiens in the 1988 NHL Entry Draft from Wisconsin Badgers  and was a member of the  United States 1992 Winter Olympic Team. On October 8, 1993, Hill scored the first goal in the history of the Mighty Ducks of Anaheim in a 2-7 loss to the Detroit Red Wings.  In August 2006 he signed a one-year contract with the Islanders.

Suspension
On April 20, 2007, Hill became the first player to be suspended for abusing the performance-enhancing substance policy the NHL and NHLPA have put in place. Hill began the mandatory 20-game suspension in Game 5 of the Islanders' Eastern Conference Quarter-Final versus the Buffalo Sabres. The Islanders lost the game and were eliminated from the playoffs. Islanders General Manager Garth Snow said that he supported the league's decision to suspend Hill. Hill, who was signed by the Minnesota Wild as a free agent in July 2007, would be required to sit out the first 19 games of the 2007–08 season without pay. In July, Hill claimed that he passed both a lie detector test, and independent drug test regarding his substance abuse. In a statement, the Wild said, "We believe Sean did not knowingly take any banned performance-enhancing substance." Hill returned to the lineup on November 21, 2007, after completing the 20-game suspension.

Career statistics

Regular season and playoffs

International

Awards and honors

References

External links

1970 births
Living people
American men's ice hockey defensemen
American sportspeople in doping cases
EHC Biel players
Carolina Hurricanes players
Doping cases in ice hockey
Florida Panthers players
Fredericton Canadiens players
Ice hockey people from Duluth, Minnesota
Ice hockey players at the 1992 Winter Olympics
Mighty Ducks of Anaheim players
Minnesota Wild players
Montreal Canadiens draft picks
Montreal Canadiens players
New York Islanders players
Olympic ice hockey players of the United States
Ottawa Senators players
St. Louis Blues players
Stanley Cup champions
Wisconsin Badgers men's ice hockey players
NCAA men's ice hockey national champions
AHCA Division I men's ice hockey All-Americans